Leandro Alves de Carvalho (born 21 September 1996), known as Leandrinho, is a Brazilian footballer who plays as a midfielder for Operário Ferroviário.

Club career
Leandrinho was born in Rio de Janeiro, Rio de Janeiro and started his career at Botafogo. He made his first team debut on 30 January 2016, against Bangu, for the Campeonato Carioca and scored his first goal in a 1–0 away win against Boavista on 17 April 2016. He made his Série A debut on 15 May 2016, from starting in a 0–1 home loss against São Paulo.

On 14 January 2019, Sport Recife announced that they had loaned Leandrinho and his teammate Ezequiel from Botafogo for the 2019 season.

Career statistics

Honours

Club
Botafogo
 Campeonato Carioca: 2018

Sport Recife
 Campeonato Pernambucano: 2019

References

External links
Sport Recife profile 

1996 births
Living people
Footballers from Rio de Janeiro (city)
Brazilian footballers
Association football midfielders
Campeonato Brasileiro Série A players
Campeonato Brasileiro Série B players
Primeira Liga players
Botafogo de Futebol e Regatas players
Sport Club do Recife players
Gil Vicente F.C. players
Brazilian expatriate footballers
Expatriate footballers in Portugal